Tanya Lapointe is a Canadian filmmaker and former journalist, most noted for her 2020 documentary film The Paper Man (Lafortune en papier).

A longtime arts and culture journalist for Ici Radio-Canada, she began dating film director Denis Villeneuve in the mid-2010s. She took a leave of absence from the network in 2015 to work as a production assistant on Villeneuve's film Arrival, subsequently announcing her departure from journalism in 2016.

Her own debut as a documentary filmmaker, 50/50, was broadcast by Radio-Canada in 2018, and examined the gender gap between men and women in society. The Paper Man premiered at the Whistler Film Festival in 2020, where it won the Audience Award.

She participated in the 2021 edition of Le Combat des livres, advocating for Melchior Mbonimpa's novel Le totem des Baranda.

References

External links

Canadian arts journalists
Canadian women television journalists
Canadian documentary film directors
Canadian women film directors
Canadian documentary film producers
Canadian women film producers
Living people
Year of birth missing (living people)
Canadian women documentary filmmakers